Calliostoma turbinum is a species of sea snail, a marine gastropod mollusk in the family Calliostomatidae.

Description
The shell is small, turbinate and thin. The nacre shines with a peculiarly coppery luster.  The apex is white. The periphery is painted with purple-brown flammules and the spirals are more or less articulated with the same color. The columella is white.

Distribution
This species occurs in the Pacific Ocean from Point Conception to San Diego, California.

References

External links
 To Biodiversity Heritage Library (10 publications)
 To USNM Invertebrate Zoology Mollusca Collection
 To ITIS
 To World Register of Marine Species

turbinum
Gastropods described in 1895